Cape Canaveral and adjacent Merritt Island on Florida's Atlantic coast are home to the USA's Eastern Range, the most active rocket range and spaceport in the country. The Eastern Range hosts two groundside operators: the military Cape Canaveral Space Force Station and the civilian Kennedy Space Center. Between them are dozens of launch pads, with several currently in active service and more in planning for activation.

Kennedy Space Center
Kennedy Space Center, operated by NASA, has two launch complexes on Merritt Island comprising four pads—two active, one under lease, and one inactive. From 1968 to 1975, it was the site of 13 Saturn V launches, three crewed Skylab flights and the Apollo–Soyuz; all Space Shuttle flights from 1981 to 2011, and one Ares 1-X flight in 2009. Since 2017, SpaceX use Launch Complex 39A to launch their launch vehicles.

Cape Canaveral Space Force Station
Cape Canaveral Space Force Station (CCSFS), operated by Space Launch Delta 45 of the U.S. Space Force, was the site of all U.S. crewed launches before Apollo 8, as well as many other early Department of Defense (DoD) and NASA launches. For the DoD, it plays a secondary role to Vandenberg AFB in California, but is the launch site for many NASA uncrewed space probes, as those spacecraft are typically launched on United States Space Force launchers. Much of the support activity for CCSFS occurs at Patrick Space Force Base to the south, its reporting base.

Active launch vehicles are in bold.

Active sites

Sites leased for future use

Spaceport Florida

, Air Force Space Command committed to lease Cape Canaveral Space Launch Complex 36 to Space Florida for future use by the Athena III launch system. It is not known if the plan was subsequently implemented. Blue Origin leased Complex 36 in 2015, with plans to launch its reusable orbital vehicle from there by 2020 though as of early 2022 the launch is planned for the end of this year.

Inactive and previously used sites

Other

See also
 Air Force Space and Missile Museum

References

External links
Encyclopedia Astronautica entry
Google Earth Merritt Island Tour

Kennedy Space Center
Launch sites
Rocket launch sites in the United States
Spaceports in the United States
Launch sites
Technology-related lists
Space lists
Lists of buildings and structures in Florida
Space Shuttle program